Gabriel Moisés Antunes da Silva (born 13 May 1991), known as Gabriel Silva, is a Brazilian professional footballer who plays as a left-back.

Club career

Palmeiras
Gabriel Silva made his debut for Palmeiras by starting a Campeonato Paulista 2010 match against Monte Azul on 27 January 2010.

Gabriel's first match in the Série A came in a 1–0 loss to rivals São Paulo on 26 May 2010, and his first goal as a professional footballer, was against Avaí, on 18 July 2010. His second professional goal was also scored against Avaí, on 7 October 2010.

Udinese
In a complicated transfer, Gabriel Silva signed for Udinese, who, however, were unable to register any more non-EU players according to Serie A rules. He was player was subsequently registered with Udinese's Spanish feeder club Granada and then immediately loaned to Novara for the remainder of the 2011–12 season.

After subsequent loans at Carpi and Genoa in the 2015–16 season, Gabriel Silva returned to Granada again in a loan deal.

Saint-Étienne
Gabriel Silva signed for French Ligue 1 side Saint-Étienne on 9 August 2017. He made his debut as an 86th minute substitution against Caen. He scored his first goal for the club in 2–2 draw with Rennes before getting sent off late on in the same game. Silva's contract with Saint-Étienne was terminated by mutual agreement on 27 January 2023.

Honours
Saint-Étienne

 Coupe de France runner-up: 2019–20

Brazil U20
South American Youth Championship: 2011
FIFA U-20 World Cup: 2011

References

External links
 
 
 

1991 births
Living people
People from Piracicaba
Brazilian footballers
Association football defenders
Campeonato Brasileiro Série A players
Sociedade Esportiva Palmeiras players
Serie A players
Ligue 1 players
Championnat National 2 players
Championnat National 3 players
Ligue 2 players
Udinese Calcio players
Novara F.C. players
A.C. Carpi players
Granada CF footballers
AS Saint-Étienne players
Brazil under-20 international footballers
Brazil youth international footballers
Brazilian expatriate footballers
Brazilian expatriate sportspeople in Italy
Expatriate footballers in Italy
Brazilian expatriate sportspeople in Spain
Expatriate footballers in Spain
Brazilian expatriate sportspeople in France
Expatriate footballers in France
Footballers from São Paulo (state)